The Caldas Novas State Park is a state park in the state of Goiás, Brazil.
It protects an area of cerrado vegetation on a large plateau which is important in replenishing the aquifers that supply warm mineral springs in the region.

Location

The Caldas Novas State Park  is in the municipalities of Caldas Novas and Rio Quente, Goiás.
It protects a remnant of the cerrado biome surrounded by farms and urban areas.
The park is elliptical, covering the large plateau of the Serra de Caldas and its sides, which form natural walls.
The Serra is also called the Caldas Ridge or the Structural Dome of Caldas.

History

The Caldas Novas State Park was created by law 7.282 on 25 September 1970.

Its objectives are to preserve the fauna, flora, springs and their surroundings, to protect natural sites of ecological and touristic importance, and to support managed use for leisure, education and scientific research.

Decree 1.531 of 21 July 1978 gave administrative responsibility to FEMAGO, now SEMARH.

In 1998 funding from Furnas Centrais Elétricas in compensation for the environmental impact of the Corumbá I Hydroelectric Power Plant was used to build infrastructure.

This included the administrative headquarters, visitors' center and accommodation for researchers and guards.

The park opened to visitors on 14 March 1999 on an experimental basis. All visitors had to be accompanied by guides.

The buffer zone was established by administrative rule 69/2014.

Geothermal aquifer

The Serra de Caldas is one of the most important sources of recharge of the hydrothermal aquifers that are the main tourist attractions of the Caldas Novas and Rio Quente region.
The municipalities of Caldas Novas and Rio Quente form the largest thermal waters tourist complex in the world.
Groundwater from the plateau infiltrates through the soil and through faulted and fractured rocks, gradually warming as it sinks deeper, until at a depth of  it is  warmer than the average surface temperature. It then migrates up to the surface through fractures to form thermal springs.
A 2005 study noted that the thermal aquifer water levels were dropping quickly due to excessive pumping by tubular wells.

Visiting

The park is open from 8:00 to 17:00 Tuesday to Sunday.
There is a small entrance fee.
There are two official trails with waterfalls, one trail through the cerrado vegetation, and three look-outs with a panoramic view of the city of Caldas Novas. All the trails are easy, but may be hot.

The Cascatinha lookout on this trail gives a beautiful view.
From the waterfall some steep steps lead to the Paredão lookout, which gives a 360º view of the city.
The short Diversiflora trail gives an interesting guide to the vegetation of the cerrado.

Notes

Sources

State parks of Brazil
Protected areas established in 1970
1970 establishments in Brazil
Protected areas of Goiás